Nowzad (also Romanized as Nowzād and Nauzad; also known as Nowzad Mo’men Abad) is a village in Miyandasht Rural District, in the Central District of Darmian County, South Khorasan Province, Iran. At the 2006 census, its population was 889, in 270 families.

References 

Populated places in Darmian County